Deanna Booher (August 6, 1948 – January 7, 2022) was an American actress, professional wrestler, and roller derby skater. She is known for her appearances with Gorgeous Ladies of Wrestling as Matilda the Hun, as well as her appearances in films such as Brainsmasher... A Love Story and Spaceballs.

Early life 
Booher grew up in Lake Arrowhead, California. Prior to becoming involved in wrestling, she held jobs including as a masseuse and as a phone sex operator. She wrestled at El Camino Junior College in California, helping the team win a state championship.

Professional wrestling career 
Booher made her first foray into professional wrestling by organizing amateur mud wrestling shows, performing as a masked character named "Queen Kong". After California's gaming commission barred her from wrestling men, her first professional match was against a  bear.

Booher later teamed with GLOW creator David McLane and director Matt Cimber to cast, recruit and train performers for the first all-women's professional wrestling show. She also wrote the show's theme song. Booher portrayed Matilda the Hun in GLOW. Her villainous character ate raw meat in the ring and scared children in the crowd, which Booher said she enjoyed. 
 	
After two years with GLOW, Booher and others left to form a competing show called Powerful Women of Wrestling, but it was unsuccessful.

Booher said she learned her signature move, a big splash, from watching English professional wrestler Big Daddy.

In 2012, Booher appeared in a documentary about GLOW, titled GLOW: The Story of the Gorgeous Ladies of Wrestling.

Acting career 
After Booher's professional wrestling career, she earned a living doing stunt work as well as by performing singing telegrams that incorporated aspects of wrestling.

Booher had several film roles in her career, including in the Mel Brooks comedy Spaceballs. She was in the romantic comedy Brainsmasher... A Love Story alongside Andrew "Dice" Clay and Teri Hatcher. She also appeared in the music video for Aerosmith's "Love in an Elevator", carrying a dwarf on her shoulders.

She also had guest-starring roles in television, including Married... with Children, My Two Dads, Mama's Family and Night Court. She often portrayed her Queen Kong character in these roles.

Personal life and death 
Booher was married to her husband Ken Booher for 39 years before he died.  She had one son, Dean Booher.

By 2017, Booher used a motorized wheelchair because of wrestling-related spinal deterioration. In her later life, she had lupus and peripheral neuropathy. She died on January 7, 2022, at the age of 73.

Filmography

Bibliography 
 Glamazon Queen Kong: My Life of Glitter, Guts, and Glory (2014)

References

External links
 
 Papers of Deanna Booher, 1970-2017: A Finding Aid. Schlesinger Library, Radcliffe Institute, Harvard University.
 
 

1948 births
2022 deaths
21st-century American actresses
American film actresses
American television actresses
American female professional wrestlers
Faux German professional wrestlers
Actors from Torrance, California
Sportspeople from Torrance, California
Professional wrestlers from California